Pierre-Marc Bouchard (born April 27, 1984) is a Canadian former professional ice hockey player. Bouchard played his junior hockey with the Chicoutimi Saguenéens in the Quebec Major Junior Hockey League (QMJHL), and is the older brother of Austrian Hockey League player François Bouchard. Bouchard was selected eighth overall in the 2002 NHL Entry Draft by the Minnesota Wild and has also featured in the National Hockey League (NHL) with the New York Islanders. He is the cousin of P. A. Parenteau.

Playing career
As a youth, Bouchard played in the 1998 Quebec International Pee-Wee Hockey Tournament with the College-Français Rive-Sud minor ice hockey team from South Shore, Montreal.

Bouchard appeared in professional play for the first time in the 2002–03 NHL season in which he posted 7 goals and 13 assists for a total of 20 points in 50 games for the Minnesota Wild. During the 2004–05 NHL lockout, he played for the Wild's American Hockey League (AHL) affiliate, the Houston Aeros. Within this time period, Bouchard vastly improved his game. This was proved in the 2005–06 NHL season, where he posted 17 goals and 42 assists for 59 points in 80 games.

During his career, Bouchard was regarded as a creative playmaker and strong team player who often attempted unorthodox techniques during play. An example of one of these techniques was performed during an overtime shootout attempt in which he converted by utilizing a variation of a "spin-o-rama" against Chicago Blackhawks goaltender Nikolai Khabibulin. He repeated this move several years later, again against Khabibulin, though he did so during regulation play on a breakaway, rather than during an overtime shootout attempt. Bouchard later credited the move to his younger brother François Bouchard.

On July 25, 2008, Bouchard signed a five-year, $20.4 million contract with the Wild. After suffering a hit to the head late in the 2008–09 season, Bouchard missed the rest of that season and all but the season opener of the 2009–10 season with post-concussion syndrome. Bouchard resumed play on December 1, 2010, against the Phoenix Coyotes after a 13-month absence, having missed 112 games. Bouchard scored a goal in his second game back, a 3–2 shootout loss to the Calgary Flames.

On July 5, 2013, Bouchard signed a one-year, $2 million contract with the New York Islanders. On February 6, 2014, he was traded to the Chicago Blackhawks (along with Peter Regin) in exchange for a fourth-round draft pick in the 2014 NHL Entry Draft, and was assigned to the Blackhawks' AHL affiliate, the Rockford IceHogs.

On July 8, 2014, Bouchard signed a one-year contract with Swiss club EV Zug of the National League A (NLA). The contract also included an NHL out clause if he could reach a deal with a club prior to July 15. In his debut season with Zug in 2014–15, Bouchard's transition was seamless in producing as their top-line centre with 51 points in 49 games. On December 23, 2014, he signed a two-year contract extension with Zug. Team captains and coaches of the NLA teams voted Bouchard MVP of the 2015–16 regular season.

On March 18, 2016, Bouchard announced his retirement from professional hockey. Bouchard, who missed more than a year with concussions during his career, commented on his decision, saying he did not want to risk any further health issues.

Career statistics

Regular season and playoffs

International

Awards
 CHL Player of the Year – 2001–02
 NHL YoungStars Game – 2004
 NLA top scorer – 2015–16

References

External links
 

1984 births
Living people
Bridgeport Sound Tigers players
Canadian ice hockey right wingers
Chicoutimi Saguenéens (QMJHL) players
EV Zug players
French Quebecers
Houston Aeros (1994–2013) players
Ice hockey people from Quebec
Minnesota Wild draft picks
Minnesota Wild players
National Hockey League first-round draft picks
New York Islanders players
Rockford IceHogs (AHL) players
Sportspeople from Sherbrooke
Canadian expatriate ice hockey players in Switzerland